The Piazza della Santissima Annunziata is a square in the city of Florence, in the Tuscany region of Italy. The Piazza is named after the church of the Annunziata at the head of the square. In the center of the piazza is the bronze Equestrian statue of Ferdinando I and two Mannerist fountains with fantastical figures, all works completed by the  Late Renaissance sculptor Pietro Tacca.

Buildings around the square

Palazzo Budini Gattai
Loggia dei Servi di Maria
National Archeological Museum
Ospedale degli Innocenti
Palazzo delle Due Fontane

Santissima Annunziata
Odonyms referring to religion